Reginald Lee Jones (born May 8, 1971) is a former professional American football wide receiver in the National Football League. He played for the Carolina Panthers (1995–1996), the Kansas City Chiefs (1997–1998, 2001), and the San Diego Chargers (2000–2001). He finished his career with the Ottawa Renegades of the CFL, where he caught 28 passes in 2002.

Jones was a member of the Louisiana State University football and track and field teams.

In track and field, he competed internationally for the United States, performing in the triple jump qualifiers at the 1993 World Championships in Athletics, and placing sixth at both the 1994 IAAF World Cup and 1993 Summer Universiade. At national level, he placed third at the USA Outdoor Track and Field Championships in 1993 and 1994. He failed to make the 1992 Summer Olympics team after placing fifth at the 1992 United States Olympic Trials. At the age of eighteen he won the American Junior College triple jump title in 1991. In his collegiate career with the LSU Tigers, he placed second in the triple jump at the 1993 NCAA Division I Outdoor Track and Field Championships as well as coming seventh in the long jump and leading off the winning 4 × 100 meters relay team alongside Glenroy Gilbert, Chris King and Fabian Muyaba. The latter marked Louisiana's defence of that title, as Jones, King, Bryant Williams and Jason Sanders also won the NCAA 4 × 100 m relay in 1992.

International competitions

Personal records
100 metres – 10.25 (1993)
Long jump – 8.24 m (1994)
Triple jump – 17.12 m (1992)

National titles
NCAA Outdoor Championships
4 × 100 m relay: 1992, 1993

See also
List of people from Kansas City, Kansas

References

1971 births
Living people
Sportspeople from Kansas City, Kansas
Track and field athletes from Kansas
American football wide receivers
American male triple jumpers
American male long jumpers
American male sprinters
LSU Tigers football players
LSU Tigers track and field athletes
Ottawa Renegades players
Carolina Panthers players
Kansas City Chiefs players
London Monarchs players
San Diego Chargers players
World Athletics Championships athletes for the United States
African-American male track and field athletes
21st-century African-American sportspeople
20th-century African-American sportspeople